Bernard Leon Schwartz (born December 13, 1925) is the former Chairman of the Board and CEO of Loral Space & Communications, a position he held for 34 years. He also served as Chairman and CEO of K&F Industries, Inc., and president and CEO of Globalstar Telecommunications. He retired from Loral and his positions at its various subsidiaries and affiliates as of March 1, 2006. He is currently the Chairman and CEO of BLS Investments, his own investment firm located in Manhattan.

Biography
Schwartz was born in Brooklyn, New York. and grew up in the Bensonhurst neighborhood of Brooklyn. He is Jewish. Schwartz graduated from Townsend Harris High School in NYC. He holds a B.S. in finance and an honorary doctorate of science from City University of New York. He is a World War II veteran, having served in the US Army Air Corps. After school, he worked as an accountant eventually becoming a partner at a Wall Street firm. He then went on to serve as a vice president of American President Lines and then president of Reliance Insurance Co. (formerly Leasco) for four years. In 1972, he bought a 12% stake in Loral Corporation, a New York Stock Exchange-listed manufacturer of satellites and satellite systems, where he served as its Chairman and CEO for 34 years.

Political activities
Schwartz is a lifelong Democrat. According to NBC News, he was the largest single contributor to the Democratic Party from 1992 to 1996. In 1996, he celebrated his 71st birthday with Bill and Hillary Clinton at the White House. In 1998 Schwartz became embroiled in a campaign donations scandal and an alleged transfer of missile technology to China that occurred in 1996. He was exonerated of any wrongdoing in the campaign finance matter after a Justice Department investigation.  Loral settled the missile transfer matter with the Justice Department in 2002, paying a $14 million fine and admitting no wrongdoing.

In 2016, Schwartz donated US$1 million to Priorities USA Action, a Super PAC supporting Democratic presidential candidate Hillary Clinton. Schwartz is also in the $5 million - $10 million bracket of donors to the Clinton Foundation.

Foreign Policy
In 2002, the Bernard L. Schwartz Senior Fellowship in Business and Foreign Policy was established at the Council on Foreign Relations with a gift from the Bernard and Irene Schwartz Foundation. The fellowship was created to focus on the global integration of financial markets and its implications for U.S. economic and foreign policy. Schwartz did not actually become a member of the Council on Foreign Relations until 2003, the following year.

Personal life
Schwartz was married to the former Irene Zanderer and lives in New York City; she died in 2014. They had two daughters. He remarried to Denise Jansen. Schwartz was a member of the United Jewish Appeal Federations's real estate committee.

In 2002, he and his wife donated $5 million to Baruch College.

References

External links
Official website

1925 births
Living people
Philanthropists from New York (state)
American chief executives
20th-century American Jews
People from Brooklyn
Loral Space & Communications
New York (state) Democrats
American real estate businesspeople
Townsend Harris High School alumni
United States Army Air Forces personnel of World War II
21st-century American Jews